The 1975 Cincinnati Reds season was a season in American baseball. The Reds dominated the league all season, and won the National League West with a record of 108–54, the best record in MLB and finished 20 games ahead of the Los Angeles Dodgers. The Reds went on to win the National League Championship Series by defeating the Pittsburgh Pirates in three straight games, and the World Series in seven games over the Boston Red Sox. The Reds were managed by Sparky Anderson and played their home games at Riverfront Stadium. It was the first World Series championship for Cincinnati since 1940. The 1975 Reds are one of the few teams to consistently challenge the 1927 New York Yankees for the title of the best team in major league history. The Reds went 64–17 at home in 1975, which remains the best home record ever by a National League team. It is currently the second best home record in MLB history, behind the 1961 Yankees, who went 65-16.

Offseason 
 October 25, 1974: Andy Kosco was released by the Reds.
 October 25, 1974: Phil Gagliano was released by the Reds.
 January 2, 1975: Joe Henderson was purchased by the Reds from the Chicago White Sox.

Regular season 
The 1975 Reds clinched a playoff appearance on September 7, the earliest clinch date of any MLB team in a 162-game season.

Joe Morgan was the National League's Most Valuable Player in 1975.

Season standings

Record vs. opponents

Notable transactions 
 April 8, 1975: Roger Freed was purchased from the Reds by the Sultanes de Monterrey.
 May 6, 1975: Doug Corbett was signed as a free agent by the Reds.

Roster

Player stats

Batting

Starters by position 
Note: Pos = Position; G = Games played; AB = At bats; H = Hits; Avg. = Batting average; HR = Home runs; RBI = Runs batted in

Other batters 
Note: G = Games played; AB = At bats; H = Hits; Avg. = Batting average; HR = Home runs; RBI = Runs batted in

Pitching

Starting pitchers 
Note: G = Games pitched; IP = Innings pitched; W = Wins; L = Losses; ERA = Earned run average; SO = Strikeouts

Other pitchers 
Note: G = Games pitched; IP = Innings pitched; W = Wins; L = Losses; ERA = Earned run average; SO = Strikeouts

Relief pitchers 
Note: G = Games pitched; W = Wins; L = Losses; SV = Saves; ERA = Earned run average; SO = Strikeouts

Postseason

National League Championship Series

Game One 
October 4, Riverfront Stadium

Game Two 
October 5, Riverfront Stadium

Game Three 
October 7, Three Rivers Stadium

World Series

Awards and honors 
 Sparky Anderson, Associated Press NL Manager of the Year
 Johnny Bench, Lou Gehrig Award
 Gary Nolan, Hutch Award
 Pete Rose, World Series Most Valuable Player
 Joe Morgan, NL MVP

All-Stars 
All-Star Game
 Johnny Bench, catcher, starter
 Dave Concepción, shortstop, starter
 Joe Morgan, second baseman, starter
 Pete Rose, right fielder, starter
 Tony Pérez, reserve

Farm system 

LEAGUE CHAMPIONS: Eugene

Notes

References 
1975 Cincinnati Reds season at Baseball Reference

Cincinnati Reds seasons
Cincinnati Reds season
National League West champion seasons
National League champion seasons
World Series champion seasons
Cincinnati Reds